La Kretz Bridge, also known as the North Atwater Bridge or La Kretz Crossing, is a cable-stayed steel pedestrian bridge that crosses the Los Angeles River, linking Griffith Park with Atwater Village, Los Angeles, immediately south of North Atwater Park. The bridge is noted for a white spire that rises  and uses  of steel. It was completed in February 2020, and is the 2nd bridge crossing the Los Angeles River to be completed in the 21st century.

History 
La Kretz Bridge was initially envisioned as a privately funded bridge, driven by a desire in 1998 by John Ferraro to build an equestrian bridge north of Los Feliz Boulevard. Morton La Kretz, a local philanthropist, donated $4.75 million toward the bridge's research, design and construction expenses. 

In 2017, the Los Angeles City Council approved the construction of the bridge. The bridge was constructed at a cost of $16.1 million, with about 75% of the total costs borne by taxpayer funds, supplemented with fundraising efforts led by River LA. The city's budgetary estimates in 2012 had projected that the bridge would cost $4.67 million.

See also 

 Atwater Village
 Los Angeles River
 Griffith Park

References 

Bridges in Los Angeles County, California
Los Angeles River
Atwater Village, Los Angeles
Pedestrian bridges in California
Bridges completed in 2020
2020 establishments in California